Grant Bluett (born 6 November 1972) is an Australian orienteering competitor.

He won a gold medal in the individual event at the World Games in 2001.

In perhaps the biggest upset in the history of world-level orienteering, Grant Bluett (Australia) won the men's race to become the first men's World Games orienteering champion. His victory is the first ever senior individual medal by a Non-European competitor and a great boost for orienteering as a world sport.

His best results at the World Orienteering Championships are the 8th position in the sprint distance in 2003, and 6th in the relay in 2001 with the Australian team.

"Constable Frogga", as he is known to his friends, is a well-respected Australian orienteer and his wisdom is much sought after by juniors from all states.

In 2012, "The Human in car navigation system" was added to the World Orienteering Hall of Fame. The "Garmin" of Canberra stated that this honour, coupled with his under-8 participation award for running in circles, was the proudest moment of his life.

"Bluey", as he is affectionately known in social circles, continues to coach youngsters in an effort to raise the non-existent status of competitive orienteering.

World Orienteering Championships Results

See also
 List of orienteers
 List of orienteering events

References

External links
 
 

1972 births
Living people
Australian orienteers
Male orienteers
Foot orienteers
World Games medalists in orienteering
World Games gold medalists
Competitors at the 2001 World Games
Competitors at the 2005 World Games
21st-century Australian people